Kim Mourmans (born 1 April 1995) is a Dutch footballer who plays as a midfielder for Beerse Boys. She has been a member of the Netherlands women's national team.

References

1995 births
Living people
Dutch women's footballers
Women's association football midfielders
Standard Liège (women) players
PSV (women) players
AFC Ajax (women) players
ADO Den Haag (women) players
BeNe League players
Eredivisie (women) players
Netherlands women's international footballers
Dutch expatriate women's footballers
Dutch expatriate sportspeople in Belgium
Expatriate women's footballers in Belgium
Footballers from Maastricht